"A Sailor Went to Sea" is a traditional children's nursery rhyme, clapping game, and skipping rhyme.  It was initially called 'My Father Went to Sea', before becoming more widely known as 'A Sailor Went to Sea'.

Lyrics
A first verse of A Sailor Went To Sea goes as:

A sailor went to sea, sea, sea,
To see what he could see, see, see.
But all that he could see, see, see,
Was the bottom of the deep blue sea, sea, sea.

While saying "sea", aquatic waves are mimed with the hand; while saying "see", the hand is brought to the eye to mime a "seeing" gesture.

Further verses typically replace "sea/see" with other words, such as "chop", "knee", "bed", or "pick", with appropriate gestural substitutions.

In popular culture
 In 1994, VeggieTales parodied the song in its second episode, "God Wants Me to Forgive Them!?!" during a parody of Gilligan's Island. The crew members sing "Some Veggies Went To Sea" in an attempt to entertain their passengers.
 In 2016, the song appeared in "Gloriana", episode 10, season 1 of the Netflix drama The Crown.
 In 2022, the song was a recurring motif in Molly of Denali episode "Unsinkable Molly Mabray." The protagonists sing the song multiple times while constructing a boat and during fantasy sequences.

See also
"Pretty Little Dutch Girl"

References

Further reading

External links 
 The British Library - Audio recording of A Sailor Went to Sea, 1972

Clapping games
Folk songs
Skipping rhymes